Yahya al-Abyadh  is a Yemeni politician. He served as Minister of Electricity and Water from 2001 to 2003.

Education 
He born in Sana'a. He received his BA in electrical engineering from Germany.

References 

Electricity ministers of Yemen
21st-century Yemeni politicians
People from Sanaa